Anis Shorrosh (January 6, 1933, Nazareth, Palestine – May 13, 2018, Mobile, Alabama) was a Palestinian Evangelical Christian, who published many books and debated with Ahmad Deedat. Shorrosh was the translator of The True Furqan, which he said was intended to challenge the Quran. Shorrosh translated the book to English from Arabic.

Shorrosh served as pastor and evangelist in the Middle East from 1959–1966.

Born in Nazareth, he became a refugee in Jordan during the Arab-Israeli War, and later came to the United States with the help of missionaries. He received two degrees from Baptist seminaries, including a doctorate.

Shorrosh's 1988 book Islam Revealed presents "armed Jihad and violence as central to Islam".

In September 1995, Shorrosh was guest lecturer at NCI Bible College, Auckland, New Zealand. In the years 2004–2005, he held a tour around the world, giving lectures and holding debates.

In 2008, he was arrested in Daphne, Alabama, and charged with first degree attempted arson for allegedly burning tax records of his religious organization in an attempt to set his building on fire.

See also
Evangelicalism
Palestinian Christians

References

Palestinian evangelicals
Palestinian translators
Palestinian refugees
People from Nazareth
Palestinian emigrants to the United States
1933 births
2018 deaths
20th-century translators